Blanc's dwarf gecko (Lygodactylus blanci) is a species of lizard in the family Gekkonidae. The species is native to central Madagascar. They are the least known species of dwarf geckos in Madagascar. Blanc's dwarf geckos are one out of eleven gecko species that are protected in Madagascar. Hence, collecting them is only allowed with an appropriate permit.

Etymology
Both the specific name, blanci, and the common name, Blanc's dwarf gecko, are in honor of French herpetologist Charles Pierre Blanc (born 1933).

Habitat
The preferred natural habitat of L. blanci is large rocks. Blanc's dwarf geckos also use buildings and tall trees near freshwater wetlands as their habitat. This species has been observed to be adapted to human environments.

Description
A large species for its genus, L. blanci may attain a snout-to-vent length (SVL) of almost . Blanc's dwarf geckos have whorled tails. The throat is usually spotted, which can lead to the formation of longitudinal lines.

Reproduction
Lygodactylus blanci is oviparous. Based on the observations of locals in Madagascar, this species appears to be most active during the month of October and eggs are seen in January and February.

Threats
Mining, logging, wood harvesting, and habitat changes are some of the threats Blanc's dwarf gecko faces to sustain its existence.

References

Further reading
Glaw F, Vences M (2006). A Field Guide to Amphibians and Reptiles of Madagascar, Third Edition. Cologne, Germany: Vences & Glaw Verlag. 496 pp. .
Pasteur G (1967). "Note préliminaire sur les geckos du genre Lygodactylus rapportés par Charles Blanc du Mont Ibity (Madagascar)". Bulletin du Muséum National d'Histoire Naturelle, Paris 39: 439–443. (Lygodactylus blanci, new species). (in French).
Puente M, Glaw F, Vieites DR, Vences M (2009). "Review of the systematics, morphology and distribution of Malagasy dwarf geckos, genera Lygodactylus and Microscalabotes (Squamata: Gekkonidae)". Zootaxa 2103: 1–76. (Lygodactylus blanci, p. 37).
Rösler (2000). "Kommentierte Liste der rezent, subrezent und fossil bekannten Geckotaxa (Reptilia: Gekkonomorpha)". Gekkota 2: 28–153. (Lygodactylus blanci, p. 92). (in German).

Lygodactylus
Reptiles of Madagascar
Endemic fauna of Madagascar
Reptiles described in 1967
Taxa named by Georges Pasteur